The 2017 Mini Challenge season was the sixteenth season of the Mini Challenge UK. The season started on 15 April at Oulton Park and ended on 15 October at Snetterton Motor Racing Circuit. The season featured thirteen rounds across the UK.

Calendar

Entry list

Results

Championship standings
Scoring system
Championship points were awarded for the first 32 positions in each Championship Race. Entries were required to complete 75% of the winning car's race distance in order to be classified and earn points. There were bonus points awarded for Pole Position and Fastest Lap.

Championship Race points

Drivers' Championship

JCW Class

Open Class

Cooper Pro Class

Cooper Am Class

References

Mini Challenge UK
Mini Challenge UK